20 Pashons - Coptic calendar - 22 Pashons

Fixed commemorations
All fixed commemorations below are observed on 21 Pashons (29 May) by the Coptic Orthodox Church.

Saints
 Saint Martinian of Caesarea

Other Commemorations
 Commemoration of the Blessed Virgin Mary

References
Coptic Synexarion

Days of the Coptic calendar